Battle Studies is a book by Ardant du Picq, a colonel in the French Army who was killed in 1870 in the Franco-Prussian War. The work was never completed, but Du Picq had written many chapters completely and left sufficient notes behind to complete the book.

Themes of the book
The theme of the book, according to Marshal of France Ferdinand Foch, is that "moral force" is the most powerful element in the strength of armies and the preponderating influence in the outcome of battles. In general form, he states:

The goal of the army
Combat is the object, the cause of being, and the supreme manifestation of an army. Every measure that does not keep combat as the object of the army is fatal. All the resources accumulated in time of peace, all the training, and all the strategic calculations must have the goal of combat.

Man in combat
The human element is more important than theories. War is still more of an art than a science.  One popular quote demonstrating this conclusion drawn from numerous battle studies states, "Nothing can wisely be prescribed in any army... without exact knowledge of the fundamental instrument, man, and his state of mind, his morale, at the instant of combat."
Great strategists and leaders of men are marked by inspiration. "Generals of genius draw from the human heart ability to execute a surprising variety of movements which vary the routine; the mediocre ones, who have no eyes to read readily, are doomed to the worst errors.” 

Du Picq's work attempts to deal with the principles of warfare as an empirical study, based on case studies of battles. 

Battle Studies  became a key textbook in the French Army's École de Guerre in the years leading to World War I.

See also
Battle Studies World Tour

References

External links
Battle Studies, Ardant du Picq's book about soldiers reaction during battle. Free version on Project Gutenberg, translation by John N. Greely and Robert C. Cotton.

19th-century books
Military strategy books
Unfinished books